The Yearning is the 2005 debut album by Chilean rock band Aisles.

Track listing

References

2005 debut albums
Aisles albums